Seth Harp (born February 26, 1943) is an American politician who served in the Georgia State Senate from 2001 to 2011. Harp was a delegate of the Republican National Convention in 2000. Harp got a Bachelor of Pharmacy at Auburn University and a Doctor of Law from Mercer University. Harp served as a Captain of the United States Marine Corps and as an Assistant Staff Judge Advocate for the United States Naval Forces. Harp is currently a practicing Methodist. Harp is a member of the National Rifle Association.

References

1943 births
Living people
Republican Party Georgia (U.S. state) state senators